The River Glass is a river in the Scottish Highlands which flows northeastwards down Strathglass. It begins at the confluence of the River Affric and the Abhainn Deabhag, near the village of Tomich. It is joined by the River Cannich near the village of Cannich, then flows as far as a confluence with the River Farrar near Struy, from which point the merged waters are known as the River Beauly.

The river is crossed by several bridges:
Fasnakyle Bridge, unclassified road
Comar Bridge, near Cannich, carries the A831
Mauld Bridge, near Struy, unclassified road

References 

Glass